Viudes or Viudès is a surname. Notable people with the surname include:

Isabel Viudes (born 1944), Argentine politician
Luc Viudès (born 1956), French shot putter